Elling Oliver Weeks (August 23, 1890 – September 10, 1956) was a pioneer aviator.

Biography
Weeks was born in Slater, Iowa to Oliver A. Weeks and Rachel Halverson.

He joined the Aero Club of Illinois in 1911. He then became an exhibition pilot for the Williams Aeroplane Company, operated by Osbert Edwin Williams Jr. of Scranton, Pennsylvania. In 1913 he crashed and broke four ribs and his ankle in Bath, New York.

On January 25, 1917 he married Ada May Haukole (1893-?) in Des Moines, Iowa.  She was the daughter of Charles Haukle and Mary Krumm.

Weeks died on September 10, 1956 in Los Angeles, California.

References

External links
Elling Oliver Weeks at Early Aviators

1890 births
1956 deaths
Aviation pioneers
American aviators
Members of the Early Birds of Aviation